Marcus Eriksson (born April 26, 1976) is a Swedish former professional ice hockey player.

Eriksson played six seasons in the Swedish Elite League with Leksands IF and Mora IK.

Personal information
His older brother Niklas Eriksson won a gold medal in ice hockey at the 1994 Winter Olympics with Team Sweden.

References

External links

1976 births
Leksands IF players
Living people
People from Västervik Municipality
Mora IK players
Swedish ice hockey left wingers
Sportspeople from Kalmar County